Viburnum furcatum, the forked viburnum or scarlet leaved viburnum, is a species of flowering plant in the family Adoxaceae (formerly Caprifoliaceae). Scented white flower-heads resembling those of lacecap hydrangeas are borne in summer, followed by black fruits.

This plant has gained the Royal Horticultural Society's Award of Garden Merit.

References

furcatum